Koen Huntelaar (born 8 July 1998) is a Dutch footballer who plays as a midfielder for VV DUNO. He is the nephew of Klaas-Jan Huntelaar.

Club career
Huntelaar made his professional debut in the Eerste Divisie for De Graafschap on 22 August 2016 in a game against SC Cambuur.

Personal life
He is a nephew of Klaas-Jan Huntelaar.

References

External links
 

Living people
1998 births
People from Bronckhorst
Association football midfielders
Dutch footballers
De Graafschap players
VV DUNO players
Eerste Divisie players
Derde Divisie players
Footballers from Gelderland